Longxi Township is located at Wenchuan County, Ngawa Tibetan and Qiang Autonomous Prefecture, Sichuan Province, China.

According to the census conducted in 2000, the entire township counts 4903 people. It is 15 kilometers far away from Weizhou Township where the government of Wenchuan County is located. Longxi Township is in Longxi Valley, located at the left
bank of Zagunao River in Wenchuan County (roughly 103°32′longitude east and 31°33′degree north). There is farmland distributed on both sides of Longxi Valley.

Township-level divisions of Sichuan
Ngawa Tibetan and Qiang Autonomous Prefecture